The former Temple Beth-El is a historic building located at 8801 Woodward Avenue (Woodward at Gladstone) in Detroit, Michigan. It was built in 1921 and listed on the National Register of Historic Places in 1982.

Architecture
In 1921 Detroit's Temple Beth El, under Rabbi Leo M. Franklin's leadership, had outgrown its previous building at Woodward and Eliot. In addition, many members of the congregation had moved to areas such as Boston-Edison and Atkinson Avenue that did not proscribe Jewish residents. The congregation obtained a parcel of land near these neighborhoods at Woodward and Gladstone and engaged congregant Albert Kahn to design a new temple. The cornerstone for the new building was laid on September 20, 1921, with the dedication on November 10–12, 1922.

The Kahn-designed temple is a classical, flat-roofed structure built from limestone. On the facade facing Woodward, eight ionic columns form an enormous porch and frame three large pairs of doors. Along the facade facing Gladstone, eight tall, narrow are framed by massive piers.

History
In early 1974, the Beth El congregation moved again, this time to Bloomfield Hills, and the building was sold to the Lighthouse Tabernacle, becoming known as the Lighthouse Cathedral. Little Rock Baptist Church owned the building from 2008 until 2014 and used it as a community center. In 2008, it was occupied by the Citadel of Faith Covenant Church.
In June 2010, the church became occupied by The Community Church of Christ, under the leadership of Pastor R.A. Cranford. In October 2013, Breakers Covenant Church International began leasing space for their worship services under the leadership of Pastor Aramis D. Hinds Sr. As of October 2014, Breakers Covenant Church International is now the new owner of this property.  

As of 2017 the Detroit Beth El building is now known as the Bethel Community Transformation Center, owned by a multiracial and multireligious board of trustees which plans to make the building a theater, multi-religion center, and community center.

References

External links
Photographs from the Rabbi Leo M. Franklin archives: these include photographs c. 1922 - 1973 of both the interior and exterior of the structure.
Citadel of Faith (congregation using the structure in 2009)
Breakers Covenant Church (congregation using the structure as of 2017)
Photos from Curbed Detroit.
Bethel Community Transformation Center The Bethel Community Transformation Center - organization that is located at former Temple Beth-El now.

Former synagogues in the United States
Woodward Avenue
Jews and Judaism in Detroit
Reform synagogues in Michigan
Churches in Detroit
Synagogues completed in 1921
1921 establishments in Michigan
1974 disestablishments in Michigan
National Register of Historic Places in Detroit
Synagogues on the National Register of Historic Places in Michigan
Albert Kahn (architect) buildings
Neoclassical architecture in Michigan
Former religious buildings and structures in Michigan